In enzymology, a succinylglutamate-semialdehyde dehydrogenase is an enzyme that catalyzes the chemical reaction

N-succinyl-L-glutamate 5-semialdehyde + NAD+ + H2O  N-succinyl-L-glutamate + NADH + 2 H+

The 3 substrates of this enzyme are N-succinyl-L-glutamate 5-semialdehyde, NAD+, and H2O, whereas its 3 products are N-succinyl-L-glutamate, NADH, and H+.

This enzyme belongs to the family of oxidoreductases, specifically those acting on the aldehyde or oxo group of donor with NAD+ or NADP+ as acceptor.  The systematic name of this enzyme class is N-succinyl-L-glutamate 5-semialdehyde:NAD+ oxidoreductase. Other names in common use include succinylglutamic semialdehyde dehydrogenase, N-succinylglutamate 5-semialdehyde dehydrogenase, SGSD, AruD, and AstD.  This enzyme participates in arginine and proline metabolism.

References

 
 
 
 
 
 
 

EC 1.2.1
NADH-dependent enzymes
Enzymes of unknown structure